Nyonoksa, also Nenoksa, is a rural locality (a selo) under the administrative jurisdiction of Severodvinsk Town of Oblast Significance, Arkhangelsk Oblast, Russia. Nyonoksa is accessible by land vehicles only during the winter months when the nearby swampland freezes.

Missile testing site 
Established in 1954 near Nyonoksa is “The State Central Navy Testing Range” which is the main rocket launching site of the Soviet Navy and later the Russian Navy and is also called Nyonoksa. Since 1965 numerous rockets of the types R-27, R-29, R-39 Rif and R-39M were launched from Nyonoksa. These rockets were prototypes for the employment on missile submarines.

On 15 December 2015 at 11am, an accident during a missile launch test resulted in a block of flats in the mostly military village of Sopka, which is part of Nyonoksa, being hit by part of a rocket. A fire broke out, but all residents were evacuated in time.

2019 explosion 

On 8 August 2019 an explosion occurred at or near the test site killing five and injuring six (or three) people. The explosion was followed by a brief spike in radiation levels. According to Rosatom the explosion happened on a sea platform when a "liquid-propellant engine" was tested. While Russian authorities did not disclose what the power source was intended for, some Russian media as well as U.S. President Donald Trump have linked the event to the development of the nuclear-powered cruise missile 9M730 Burevestnik, also known by its NATO reporting name as the SSC-X-9 Skyfall.

Culture and recreation
Nyonoksa hosts 7 objects which are protected as cultural heritage monuments at the federal level. They are grouped in two ensembles. The Nyonokotsky Pogost is one of the few surviving triple wooden church ensembles, consisting of two churches (a bigger, unheated, church used in the summer, a smaller, heated church used in the winter) and a bell-tower. The Nyonoksa churches are the St. Nicholas Church (1763) and the Trinity Church (1727). Nyonoksa was also notable for salt production. Another ensemble, the salt production complex, is neglected since the Great Patriotic War (WWII).

History

The city charter dates from 1397 under Novgorod and later Muscovy rule. The city was named Nyo from Old Scythian meaning "fast flowing river" and Oxa from Finno-Ugric tribes meaning "river" or "small stream". Another version claims that the settlement is named after a Finno-Ugric leader named Niyuksa Soake.

Salt production began during the 1000s and lasted until rich sources were discovered in the Urals during the 1800s which led to Nyonoksa's salt trade ending the early 1900s.

In 1419 and 1445, Norwegian Vikings or Northmen sacked wealthy Nyonoksa.

In 1553, an English ship the Edward Bonaventure in the Hugh Willoughby expedition and captained by Richard Chancellor and Clement Adams arrived during England's search for the Northern Sea Route to China and India and thus opened Russia under Czar Ivan IV to English merchants. The ship's captain and crew were taken to Czar Ivan IV while the ship was repaired. Following repairs Edward Bonaventure sailed for London in 1556 with the first Russian ambassador to England aboard, Osep Gregorovitch Napea, arriving in London in 1557. This began the formal diplomatic relations between England and Russia. Nyonoksa was Russia's original "window to England".

Notes

References

Rural localities in Severodvinsk Urban Okrug
Severodvinsk Urban Okrug
Arkhangelsky Uyezd
Military installations of the Soviet Union
Environmental disaster ghost towns
Russian Navy
Soviet Navy